Princess Maria Alexandrovna Menshikova (26 December 1711 – 1729) was a daughter of Aleksandr Danilovich Menshikov, the favourite of Peter I of Russia.

Life

She was the eldest daughter and first child of Prince Aleksandr Danilovich Menshikov and Daria Mikhailovna Arsenieva.

Thanks to her father's influence in the Russian court, she was engaged to Grand Duke Peter of Russia, a grandson of Peter the Great. Though they never married their engagement was announced and a dowry discussed. This proposal brought about the disgrace of her father who was subsequently exiled to Siberia.

After following her father into exile, she died of smallpox in Berezovo at age seventeen.

1711 births
1729 deaths
Nobility from Saint Petersburg
Menshikov family
Deaths from smallpox